The House at 15 Chestnut Street in Wakefield, Massachusetts is a well preserved high style Colonial Revival house.  It was built in 1889 for Thomas Skinner, a Boston bookkeeper.  The -story wood-frame house is topped by a hipped roof with flared eaves and a heavily decorated cornice.  A porch extends across the front of the house, which is supported by paired turned columns.  Above on the porch is a low railing with paired pillars (matching the support columns in position) topped by urns.  The front door is flanked by Ionic pilasters, then sidelight windows, and then another pair of pilasters.

The house was listed on the National Register of Historic Places in 1989.

See also
National Register of Historic Places listings in Wakefield, Massachusetts
National Register of Historic Places listings in Middlesex County, Massachusetts

References

Houses on the National Register of Historic Places in Wakefield, Massachusetts
Colonial Revival architecture in Massachusetts
Houses completed in 1885
Houses in Wakefield, Massachusetts